William Ernest Arthur Jones (12 November 1920 – 2002) was a professional footballer who played for Swansea Town, Tottenham Hotspur, Southampton, Bristol City, Rhyl and represented Wales at national level.

Football career 
Jones was born in Cwmbwrla and began his football career as an amateur at Bolton Wanderers before joining Swansea Town in October 1943. He made 37 appearances and scored three times for the club in the 1946–47 season. The free scoring winger transferred to Tottenham Hotspur in October 1947 for a £7000 fee. He went on to appear in 57 matches and found the net on 16 occasions in all competitions between 1947 and 1948.

He left Spurs in May 1949 to join Southampton in a transfer deal which involved Alf Ramsey, where he featured in 44 games and scoring on four occasions. In November 1951 he transferred to Bristol City as a player/coach and played a further 50 matches and netting seven times between 1951 and 1954. Jones ended his senior career at Rhyl in the position of player/manager.

International career
Jones played on four occasions for the Welsh national side.

After football 
After his football career ended, Jones settled in Bolton where he was employed by Hawker Siddeley. He died in November 2002

External links 
A-Z of Tottenham Hotspur players
Swansea City legends

References 

1920 births
2002 deaths
Welsh footballers
Wales international footballers
English Football League players
Swansea City A.F.C. players
Tottenham Hotspur F.C. players
Southampton F.C. players
Bristol City F.C. players
Rhyl F.C. players
Footballers from Swansea
Bury F.C. wartime guest players
Chester City F.C. wartime guest players
Rhyl F.C. managers
Bolton Wanderers F.C. players
Association football wingers
Welsh football managers